John Baker II (February 27, 1780 – July 1, 1843) was sheriff of Norfolk County, Massachusetts from 1834 to 1843.

Baker died on July 1, 1843.

References

1780 births
1843 deaths
People from Norfolk County, Massachusetts
Businesspeople from Boston
High Sheriffs of Norfolk County
18th-century American people
19th-century American people
19th-century American businesspeople
John